Henagar is a city in DeKalb County, Alabama, United States. At the 2020 census, the population was 2,292.

Henagar is located on top of Sand Mountain, a southern extension of the Cumberland Plateau.

History
Henagar was first settled circa 1855. The town is named after an early settler, George Henegar. A post office was established in 1878. It was then that a postal official misspelled the town's name as "Henagar". In 1901, a public school was built. At daybreak on November 18, 1906, a Sunday, a tornado struck the town, and all "fifteen stores and houses were reduced to splinters." They rebuilt, and Henagar incorporated in 1965.

Geography
Henagar is located in northern DeKalb County; it borders Jackson County in the northwest.

Alabama State Route 40 passes through the original center of town, leading east  to Interstate 59 in Hammondville and west  to Scottsboro. Alabama State Route 75 crosses AL 40 in the newer commercial part of Henagar and leads northeast  to Ider and southwest  to Rainsville.

South Sauty Creek, a tributary of the Tennessee River, flows southwest through the central and southern part of the city.

Demographics

2000 census
At the 2000 census there were 2,400 people, 937 households, and 715 families living in the town. The racial makeup of the town was 96.46% White, 1.67% Native American, 0.04% Asian, 0.04% Pacific Islander, 0.21% from other races, and 1.58% from two or more races. 0.71% of the population were Hispanic or Latino of any race.
Of the 937 households 34.9% had children under the age of 18 living with them, 64.8% were married couples living together, 8.2% had a female householder with no husband present, and 23.6% were non-families. 21.7% of households were one person and 10.0% were one person aged 65 or older. The average household size was 2.56 and the average family size was 2.96.

The age distribution was 24.8% under the age of 18, 9.3% from 18 to 24, 28.2% from 25 to 44, 25.0% from 45 to 64, and 12.8% 65 or older. The median age was 37 years. For every 100 females, there were 93.9 males. For every 100 females age 18 and over, there were 92.1 males.

The median household income was $29,777 and the median family income  was $34,469. Males had a median income of $29,309 versus $19,401 for females. The per capita income for the town was $14,836. About 10.3% of families and 16.9% of the population were below the poverty line, including 23.0% of those under age 18 and 25.5% of those age 65 or over.

2010 census
At the 2010 census there were 2,344 people, 942 households, and 676 families living in the town. The racial makeup of the town was 96.2% White, 1.8% Native American, 0.0% Asian, 0.0% Pacific Islander, 0.3% from other races, and 1.6% from two or more races. 1.4% of the population were Hispanic or Latino of any race.
Of the 942 households 29.6% had children under the age of 18 living with them, 55.9% were married couples living together, 9.8% had a female householder with no husband present, and 28.2% were non-families. 25.2% of households were one person and 10.6% were one person aged 65 or older. The average household size was 2.49 and the average family size was 2.93.

The age distribution was 23.9% under the age of 18, 6.8% from 18 to 24, 24.5% from 25 to 44, 29.7% from 45 to 64, and 15.1% 65 or older. The median age was 41 years. For every 100 females, there were 100.5 males. For every 100 females age 18 and over, there were 103.4 males.

The median household income was $32,130 and the median family income  was $39,432. Males had a median income of $40,227 versus $24,122 for females. The per capita income for the town was $21,701. About 17.9% of families and 19.8% of the population were below the poverty line, including 32.5% of those under age 18 and 13.6% of those age 65 or over.

2020 census

As of the 2020 United States census, there were 2,292 people, 833 households, and 608 families residing in the city.

Arts and culture
The Sand Mountain Potato Festival is celebrated each July in Henagar, with potatoes, live music, entertainment, arts and crafts, games, and fireworks.

A drive-in theater is located in Henagar.

Education
Students are served by the DeKalb County Board of Education.

Henagar Junior High School, home of "The Wildcats", is located in the town.

Notable people
 Charlie Louvin, country music singer

References

External links
City of Henagar official website

Cities in DeKalb County, Alabama
Cities in Alabama